Goodlad's stinkfish (Callionymus goodladi) is a species of dragonet native to the waters off of northwestern Australia.  This bottom-dwelling species is also found in the aquarium trade.  This species grows to a length of  TL.

Discovered in Western Australia by Matt Goodlad, who was a Shetlander who migrated to Western Australia in the 1920s with his brother James. They both worked for the government fisheries dept at some stage as inspectors.

References

External links 
 Superintendent Mathew Goodlad with his boat in Broome Western Australia

G
Fish described in 1944